Jacob Reynolds (born May 13, 1983) is an American actor. He is best known for his role as Solomon in the experimental cult film Gummo (1997).

Career
Jacob Reynolds began acting at age four. His career started with an American television commercial for Ritz Crackers. In 2007, he appeared in Chris Fuller's Gotham Award nominated independent feature Loren Cass. In addition to his acting talents, Reynolds is a trumpet player and a certified aviator.

He appeared in the 1994 film The Road to Wellville, playing a young George Kellog in several flashback sequences (the adult George Kellog was played by Dana Carvey). He also had small roles in Life with Mikey (1993) and For Love of the Game (1999). Reynolds starred in the 1997 Harmony Korine movie Gummo. He also appeared in the 2012 action-thriller The Aggression Scale, along with Derek Mears.

Reynolds is the writer of the webtoon series Perish with illustrator Esfi Morales.

References

External links

American male film actors
Male actors from Florida
1983 births
Living people